In Greek mythology, Ancaeus (Ancient Greek: Ἀγκαῖος Ankaîos) was king of the island of Samos, and an Argonaut: helmsmanship was his special skill.

Family 
Ancaeus was a son of Poseidon and Astypalaea, and brother of Eurypylus. In some sources, his mother was Althaea, daughter of Thestius. By other accounts his father was the Lelegian king Altes, which accords well with Ancaeus's rule over the Leleges of Samos.

According to a lost epic of his house, sung by the Samian poet Asios, he married Samia, daughter of the river god Maeander, who bore him Perilaus, Enudus, Samus, Alitherses, and Parthenope, the mother of Lycomedes.

Mythology 
The most famous story surrounding this Ancaeus is the following: when planting a vineyard, for Samos was famed for its wine, he was told by a seer that he would never taste its wine. Ancaeus then joined the voyage of the Argonauts, and returned home safely, by which time the grapes were ripe and had been made into wine. He summoned the seer before him, and raised a cup of his own wine to his lips, and was ready to taste it for the first time. He then mocked the seer, who retorted, "There is many a slip between the cup and the lip" (Πολλὰ μεταξὺ πέλει κύλικος καὶ χείλεος ἄκρου). Before Ancaeus had tasted the wine, an alarm was raised that a wild boar was ravaging the vineyard, and on hearing this, Ancaeus dropped the cup and went out to investigate – and was promptly killed by the boar.

Calydonian family tree

Notes

References 

 Apollonius Rhodius, Argonautica translated by Robert Cooper Seaton (1853-1915), Loeb Classical Library Volume 001. London: William Heinemann Ltd, 1912. Online version at the Topos Text Project.
 Apollonius Rhodius, Argonautica. George W. Mooney. London: Longmans, Green. 1912. Greek text available at the Perseus Digital Library.
 Gaius Julius Hyginus, Fabulae from The Myths of Hyginus translated and edited by Mary Grant. University of Kansas Publications in Humanistic Studies. Online version at the Topos Text Project.
Pausanias, Description of Greece with an English Translation by W.H.S. Jones, Litt.D., and H.A. Ormerod, M.A., in 4 Volumes. Cambridge, MA, Harvard University Press; London, William Heinemann Ltd. 1918. . Online version at the Perseus Digital Library
Pausanias, Graeciae Descriptio. 3 vols. Leipzig, Teubner. 1903.  Greek text available at the Perseus Digital Library.

Argonauts
Kings in Greek mythology
Children of Poseidon
Demigods in classical mythology
Family of Calyce
Deaths due to boar attacks
Characters in the Argonautica